Dustin Guy Defa is an American independent filmmaker and actor. He is best known for directing the feature films Bad Fever and Person to Person and writing the screenplay for The Mountain.

Early Life 

Dustin Guy Defa was born in Salt Lake City, Utah in 1978.

Career 
Defa wrote and directed his first feature film Bad Fever in 2011. It starred Kentucker Audley and Eleonore Hendricks and focused on the story of a socially inept wannabe stand up comic who becomes infatuated with a drifter he meets outside of a gas station. The film premiered at South by Southwest to positive reviews, commending the film's paired down naturalism and the direction of the actors. 

The New Yorker'''s Richard Brody praised the film, saying "Defa exerts delicate control over his incendiary material and evokes emotional terrors with a sympathetic directness; his raw-toned drama is quietly hectic and brutally poignant."

Defa then made two short films, Person to Person and Family Nightmare which both premiered at the Sundance Film Festival

In 2015, the Film Society of Lincoln Center programmed a retrospective of his short work.

Defa wrote a screenplay for a feature length version of Person to Person. The film follows a series of characters living in New York City as they navigate a myriad of complex human relationships. He cast actors including Abbi Jacobson, Michael Cera, Tavi Gevinson, Philip Baker Hall and director Josh Safdie to fill in the ensemble cast. The film premiered in the NEXT Section at the 2017 Sundance Film Festival and later had a full theatrical run.

In 2018, Defa co-wrote the subversive 1950's period film The Mountain with director Rick Alverson and Colm O'Leary.

In 2023, he directed a film The Adults, which was screened in Encounter at the 73rd Berlin International Film Festival, for its world premiere on 18 February 2023.

 Acting 
Defa acted in the feature films Computer Chess, Summer of Blood, Swim Little Fish Swim, and the TV show Easy.

He did the voiceover for the short film Family Tree.Starting in 2015, Defa began to portray the character of Aziz on The Show About the Show.
Filmography

 2011 - Family Nightmare; short film
 2012 - Bad Fever 
 2013 - The Sixth Year; segment director 
 2013 - Declaration of War; short film 
 2013 - Lydia Hoffman Lydia Hofman; short film 
 2014 - Person to Person; short film 
 2015 - Review; short film  
 2015 - God Is an Artist; short film  
 2016 - Dramatic Relationships; short film 
 2017 - Person to Person 2021 - Editing; short film 
 2023 - The Adults'' (director)

References

External links
 

1978 births
American filmmakers
Living people